Kishorganj Govt. Boys' High School or KGBHS is a higher secondary school in Kishoreganj Sadar Upazila, Kishoreganj, Bangladesh.  Established in 1881, the school has a  campus.

References

High schools in Bangladesh
1881 establishments in India
Educational institutions established in 1881
Schools in Kishoreganj District